Data collection system (DCS) is a computer application that facilitates the process of data collection, allowing specific, structured information to be gathered in a systematic fashion, subsequently enabling data analysis to be performed on the information. Typically a DCS displays a form that accepts data input from a user and then validates that input prior to committing the data to persistent storage such as a database.

Many computer systems implement data entry forms, but data collection systems tend to be more complex, with possibly many related forms containing detailed user input fields, data validations, and navigation links among the forms.

DCSs can be considered a specialized form of content management system (CMS), particularly when they allow the information being gathered to be published, edited, modified, deleted, and maintained. Some general-purpose CMSs include features of DCSs.

Importance 
Accurate data collection is essential to many business processes, to the enforcement of many government regulations, and to maintaining the integrity of scientific research.

Data collection systems are an end-product of software development. Identifying and categorizing software or a software sub-system as having aspects of, or as actually being a "Data collection system" is very important. This categorization allows encyclopedic knowledge to be gathered and applied in the design and implementation of future systems. In software design, it is very important to identify generalizations and patterns and to re-use existing knowledge whenever possible.

Types 
Generally the computer software used for data collection falls into one of the following categories of practical application.
 
 Surveys or questionnaires
 Data registries
 Case management systems
 Performance measurement systems
 Exams and quizzes
 Online forms and form filing and reporting systems

Vocabulary
There is a taxonomic scheme associated with data collection systems, with readily-identifiable synonyms used by different industries and organizations. Cataloging the most commonly used and widely accepted vocabulary improves efficiencies, helps reduce variations, and improves data quality.

The vocabulary of data collection systems stems from the fact that these systems are often a software representation of what would otherwise be a paper data collection form with a complex internal structure of sections and sub-sections. Modeling these structures and relationships in software yields technical terms describing the hierarchy of data containers, along with a set of industry-specific synonyms.

Collection synonyms
A collection (used as a noun) is the topmost container for grouping related documents, data models, and datasets. Typical vocabulary at this level includes the terms:

Data model synonyms
Each document or dataset within a collection is modeled in software. Constructing these models is part of designing or "authoring" the expected data to be collected. The terminology for these data models includes:

Sub-collection or master-detail synonyms
Data models are often hierarchical, containing sub-collections or master–detail structures described with terms such as:

Data element synonyms
At the lowest level of the data model are the data elements that describe individual pieces of data. Synonyms include:

Data point synonyms
Moving from the abstract, domain modelling facet to that of the concrete, actual data: the lowest level here is the data point within a dataset. Synonyms for data point include:

Dataset synonyms
Finally, the synonyms for dataset include:

See also
 Data management
 Survey data collection
 Case report form
 Safety data sheet
 Data mining
 Web mining
 Crowdsourcing
 Collaborative software

References

External links 

Data collection
Survey methodology